The Arleta Library Bakery & Cafe was a restaurant in Portland, Oregon, in the United States. The business operated in southeast Portland's Mt. Scott-Arleta neighborhood for approximately fifteen years; Arleta was established by owners Sarah and Nick Iannarone in 2005 and closed in 2020, during the COVID-19 pandemic. Guy Fieri had visited the restaurant for an episode of the Food Network's Diners, Drive-Ins and Dives.

Description 
The business operated at the intersection of 72nd Avenue and Harold in southeast Portland's Mt. Scott-Arleta neighborhood. According to Willamette Week, "This family-owned treasure uses local ingredients like Painted Hills natural beef in the Sicilian hash and Pearl Bakery brioche in the battered and grilled pan dolce, served with whipped honey butter, organic maple syrup, and seasonal fresh fruit." The menu included breakfast sandwiches, omelettes, pancakes, macaroons and other baked goods, and coffee. The Portland's Best Biscuits-n-Gravy had two biscuits with sausage gravy and pork loin, and the Hawthorne scrambles had eggs and Tillamook cheddar.

History 
Arleta opened in 2005. The business was co-owned by Sarah and Nick Iannarone, until December 2018, ahead of their 2019 divorce. Guy Fieri visited the restaurant for an episode of Diners, Drive-Ins and Dives.

After operating for approximately 15 years, Arleta closed in March 2020, during the COVID-19 pandemic. Owners said the space was too small to operate with social distancing. In May 2020, Rosie Siefert of The Daily Meal wrote, "The hole-in-the-wall ... cafe has been around for 15 years but couldn't withstand the financial strain the coronavirus pandemic placed on the establishment. Although there can't be any hugs, shoutouts or last calls, according to Arleta's Facebook page, there is a GoFundMe for patrons to give staff one last tip."

Reception 

Andy Kryza included the business in Thrillist's 2013 overview of "where to take any type of mom on her special day". Arleta was a runner-up in the Best Brunch category of Willamette Week annual Best of Portland readers poll in 2010. Jay Horton recommended Arleta in the newspaper's 2016 overview of the Mt. Scott-Arleta and Woodstock neighborhoods and wrote, "While never much of a library, the Arleta Cafe earned a certain measure of cultural permanence when Diners, Drive-Ins and Dives' Guy Fieri stopped by to marvel at its trademark sweet potato biscuits with rosemary-sausage gravy. Following the Food Network imprimatur and owner Sarah Iannarone's ill-starred mayoral candidacy, a steady string of curious interlopers have joined die-hard regulars amid the morning crush."

In 2014 and 2016, the restaurant was a finalist in The Oregonian People's Choice competition for Portland's best brunch. Michael Russell included the business in the newspaper's 2019 "ultimate guide to Portland's 40 best brunches". Followings the restaurant's closure, Karen Brooks of Portland Monthly called Arleta a "beloved neighborhood anchor".

See also

 Impact of the COVID-19 pandemic on the restaurant industry in the United States
 List of defunct restaurants of the United States
 List of Diners, Drive-Ins and Dives episodes

References

External links

 
 Arleta Library Bakery & Cafe at the Food Network
 Arleta Library Bakery & Cafe at Zomato

2005 establishments in Oregon
2020 disestablishments in Oregon
Defunct restaurants in Portland, Oregon
Mt. Scott-Arleta, Portland, Oregon
Restaurants disestablished during the COVID-19 pandemic
Restaurants disestablished in 2020
Restaurants established in 2005